Afroaeschna scotias is a species of dragonfly in the family Aeshnidae. It is found in Cameroon, Nigeria, Uganda, and Zambia. Its natural habitats are subtropical or tropical moist lowland forests and rivers.

References

Aeshnidae
Insects described in 1952
Taxonomy articles created by Polbot
Odonata of Africa